The 1942 Bowling Green Falcons football team was an American football team that represented Bowling Green State College (later renamed Bowling Green State University) as an independent during the 1942 college football season. In their second season under head coach Robert Whittaker, the Falcons compiled a 6–2–1 record and outscored opponents by a total of 135 to 55. Ralph Quesinberry was the team captain. The team played its home games at University Stadium in Bowling Green, Ohio.

Schedule

References

Bowling Green
Bowling Green Falcons football seasons
Bowling Green Falcons football